Aristolochia rotunda, commonly known as smearwort or round-leaved birthwort, is a herbaceous perennial plant native to Southern Europe.

Etymology
The genus name Aristolochia derives from the Greek words αριστος (aristos) meaning "the best" and 'lochéia' meaning ' childbirth', for the old use in promoting uterine contractions. The Latin name of the species rotunda refers to the rounded shape of the leaves.

Botanical description 
 The root reaches  in length and sometimes seems out of proportion to the slenderness of the plant. The  unbranched stem has alternate, large, smooth-edged, heart-shaped and stalkless leaves that clasp the stem with enlarged, basal lobes. The flowering period extends from April through June.

Reproduction
The flowers of Aristolochia rotunda are hermaphrodite are  pollinated by midges and other small insects (entomophily), attracted by the smell and by purple-brown color of the flowers. The small hairs inside the cup prevent the flies from coming out and flying away. After the pollination these hairs sag and allow them to escape.

This species is the only host plant of the caterpillars of a beautiful uncommon butterfly (Zerynthia polyxena). Eating the leaves of the plant the larvae this insect ingest aristolochic acid that  make them poisonous to birds.

Distribution
This plant is common in Mediterranean countries. It is rarely naturalized in the British Isles.

Habitat
These plants occur along the banks of canals, edges of ditches and fields, sides of roads, meadows, slopes and forests.

Chemical constituents
A. rotunda contains aristolochic acids which are carcinogenic, mutagenic, and nephrotoxic.

Subspecies
 Aristolochia rotunda subsp. rotunda, autonym
 Aristolochia rotunda subsp. insularis (E.Nardi & Arrigoni) Gamisans
 Aristolochia rotunda subsp. reichsteinii E.Nardi

Gallery

References

Additional references
Tela Botanica / 2000-2009 - Le réseau des Botanistes Francophones .
 Pignatti S. - Flora d'Italia - Edagricole – 1982, Vol. I, pag 135
 Tutin, T.G. et al. - Flora Europaea, second edition - 1993
 Björn Rulika, Stefan Wankeb, Matthias Nussa and Christoph Neinhuisb  Pollination of Aristolochia pallida Willd. (Aristolochiaceae) in the Mediterranean - Flora - Morphology, Distribution, Functional Ecology of Plants - Volume 203, Pages 175-184

External links
 
 

rotunda
Medicinal plants of Europe
Plants described in 1753
Taxa named by Carl Linnaeus